Georgia (minor planet designation: 359 Georgia) is a typical Main belt asteroid. It is classified as an X-type asteroid.

It was discovered by Auguste Charlois on 10 March 1893 in Nice. It was named by the daughter of Felix Klein at a meeting of the Astronomische Gesellschaft in 1902 held at the Georg August University of Göttingen, where Klein was a professor. It was named after the University's founder King George II of Great Britain, Elector of Hanover.

References

External links 
 Lightcurve plot of 359 Georgia, Palmer Divide Observatory, B. D. Warner (2009)
 Asteroid Lightcurve Database (LCDB), query form (info )
 Dictionary of Minor Planet Names, Google books
 Asteroids and comets rotation curves, CdR – Observatoire de Genève, Raoul Behrend
 Discovery Circumstances: Numbered Minor Planets (1)-(5000) – Minor Planet Center
 
 

000359
Discoveries by Auguste Charlois
Named minor planets
000359
000359
18930310